These are the Pan American Gamesc medalists in men's handball.

References

medalists